Hushpuckena Creek is a stream in the U.S. state of Mississippi.

Hushpuckena is a name derived from the Choctaw language purported to mean "sunflowers are abundant". A variant name is "Hushpuckana Bayou".

References

Rivers of Mississippi
Rivers of Coahoma County, Mississippi
Mississippi placenames of Native American origin